The Lake-Lehman School District is a small public school district located partly in Luzerne County and partly in Wyoming County. The school's namesakes are Lake Township and Lehman Township. It also serves Ross Township, Jackson Township,Harvey’s Lake Borough, and Lake Township as well as Noxen Township in Wyoming County, Pennsylvania. Lake-Lehman School District encompasses approximately 136 square miles. According to 2000 federal census data, the district serves a resident population of 16,350. In 2009, the per capita income of the district's residents was $21,145 while the median family income was $48,831.  According to a New York Times report, in 2006, the student population was 98% Caucasian, 1% black, and 1% Hispanic.

The district operates five schools: Lake-Noxen Elementary, Lehman-Jackson Elementary, Ross Elementary, Lake-Lehman Jr High, and Lake Lehman Sr High.

References

School districts in Luzerne County, Pennsylvania
School districts in Wyoming County, Pennsylvania